Bartodzieje may refer to the following places in Poland:
Bartodzieje, Lower Silesian Voivodeship (south-west Poland)
Bartodzieje, Łódź Voivodeship (central Poland)
Bartodzieje, Grójec County in Masovian Voivodeship (east-central Poland)
Bartodzieje, Pułtusk County in Masovian Voivodeship (east-central Poland)
Bartodzieje, Zwoleń County in Masovian Voivodeship (east-central Poland)
Bartodzieje, Radom County in Masovian Voivodeship (east-central Poland)
Bartodzieje, Greater Poland Voivodeship (west-central Poland)